Houd Zourdani (born 17 October 1993) is an Algerian judoka.

He won a gold medal at the 2015 African Judo Championships. 
He competed at the 2016 Summer Olympics in Rio de Janeiro, in the men's 66 kg.

References

External links 
 

1993 births
Living people
Algerian male judoka
Olympic judoka of Algeria
Judoka at the 2016 Summer Olympics
African Games gold medalists for Algeria
African Games medalists in judo
Competitors at the 2018 Mediterranean Games
Competitors at the 2015 African Games
Mediterranean Games competitors for Algeria
21st-century Algerian people
20th-century Algerian people